Oltiariq is an urban-type settlement in Fergana Region, Uzbekistan. It is the administrative center of Oltiariq District.

Population 
The town population in 1989 was 8,781 people.

References

Populated places in Fergana Region
Urban-type settlements in Uzbekistan